The following is a list of works by Catharina van Hemessen that are generally accepted as autograph by the RKD and other sources.

Sources

 Catharina van Hemessen in the RKD

Catharina van Hemessen
Hemessen